The 2011–12 Meralco Bolts season was the 2nd season of the franchise in the Philippine Basketball Association (PBA).

Key dates
August 28: The 2011 PBA Draft took place in Robinson's Place Ermita, Manila.

Draft picks

Roster

   

2

Philippine Cup

Eliminations

Standings

Bracket

Quarterfinals

Petron Blaze-Meralco series

Commissioner's Cup

Eliminations

Standings

Seeding playoffs

Bracket

Quarterfinals

B-Meg–Meralco series

Governors Cup

Eliminations

Standings

6th-seed playoffs

Semifinals

Standings

Transactions

Trades

Pre-season

Commissioner's Cup

Governors Cup

Additions

Subtractions

Recruited imports

References

Meralco Bolts seasons
Meralco